The Bushveld (from Afrikaans: bosveld, Afrikaans: bos 'bush' and ) is a sub-tropical woodland ecoregion of Southern Africa. The ecoregion straddles the Tropic of Capricorn and constitutes the southern part of the Zambezian region. It encompasses most of Limpopo and a small part of North West in South Africa, the Central and North-East Districts of Botswana and the Matabeleland South and part of Matabeleland North provinces of Zimbabwe. The Kruger National Park has a number of 'Bushveld' camps, but these are strictly speaking in the lowveld, as these terms are sometimes used interchangeably. Although their limits are somewhat blurred, lowveld is generally restricted to the more easterly parts of South Africa and Zimbabwe.

Geography
The elevation of this region varies from 750 to 1,400 m and the annual rainfall ranges from 350 mm in the west to 600 mm in parts of the northeast. There are four significant mountain ranges in this region: the Magaliesberg which runs from Rustenburg in the west to Bronkhorstspruit in the east and forms the southern border of the Bushveld; the Drakensberg escarpment that forms the eastern border of the Bushveld and runs from Tzaneen in the north to Belfast in the south; the Waterberg range that is in the middle of the Bushveld and the Soutpansberg range just north of Louis Trichardt. The latter is the northernmost mountain range in South Africa.

Flora and fauna
As implied by the region's name, the Bushveld's grassy plains are dotted by dense clusters of trees and tall shrubs. The grasses found here are generally tall and turn brown or pale in winter (May to August), which is the dry season throughout most of Southern Africa. The undisturbed portions of this habitat, such as much of the Waterberg Biosphere, are home to many large mammal species including white rhino, black rhino, giraffe, blue wildebeest, kudu, impala and a variety of additional antelope species and other game.

Geology

The Bushveld is one of the most mineral-rich regions of the world. This is due to the Bushveld igneous complex, an extremely rich saucer-shaped geological formation that stretches over more than 50,000 square kilometers. This formation contains most of the world's reserves of minerals such as andalusite, chromium, fluorspar, platinum and vanadium. The complex includes the Merensky Reef, which is the world's biggest source of platinum as well as platinum-group metals.

Farming
As most of the region tends to be dry, the Bushveld is mostly beef cattle and game farming country, with only a few drought-resistant crops such as sorghum and millet being farmed, usually under irrigation.

Middleveld

Towns and cities
Towns and cities in the region include:
 Bela Bela (formerly Warmbaths)
 Brits
 De Wildt
 Haenertsburg
 Hammanskraal
 Lephalale (formerly Ellisras)
 Louis Trichardt
 Mara
 Modimolle (formerly Nylstroom)
 Mokopane (formerly Potgietersrus)
 Mookgophong (formerly Naboomspruit)
 Musina (formerly Messina)
 Northam
 Phalaborwa
 Pienaarsrivier
 Polokwane (formerly Pietersburg)
 Roedtan
 Selebi-Phikwe
 Sun City
 Thabazimbi
. Tzaneen 
 Vaalwater
 Vivo
 Zion City Moria
 Rustenburg

See also
 Geography of South Africa
 Hlane Royal National Park
 Jock of the Bushveld

References

External links
 

Afrotropical ecoregions
Ecoregions of Botswana
Ecoregions of South Africa
Ecoregions of Zimbabwe
Geography of Matabeleland North Province
Geography of Matabeleland South Province
Geography of North West (South African province)
Grasslands of Botswana
Grasslands of South Africa
Grasslands of Zimbabwe
Geography of Limpopo
Tropical and subtropical grasslands, savannas, and shrublands
Zambezian region